Graduation Day is a 1981 American slasher film co-written, co-produced and directed by Herb Freed, and starring Christopher George, Patch Mackenzie, Michael Pataki, and E. Danny Murphy in his film debut. The plot follows a high school track team who are stalked and murdered by a masked assailant days before their graduation. Linnea Quigley, Vanna White, and Karen Abbott appear in supporting performances.

Filmed in Los Angeles, Graduation Day was released in the spring of 1981, grossing nearly $24 million on a budget of $250,000, far exceeding the genre's usual box office at the time. Though it received a largely negative reception, the film has since developed a cult following among fans of the genre.

Fatal Games, another slasher film with a similar plot, was released in 1984.

Plot
Laura Ramstead, a senior athlete at a small-town Southern California high school, collapses during a track meet, dying unexpectedly of a cardiac embolism. Two months later, her elder sister Anne, a U.S. Navy officer, arrives in town to participate in the high school graduation ceremony in which her sister will be honored. Anne blames Laura's coach, Coach Michaels, for pushing her too hard, which she believes contributed to Laura's death. As Anne passes through downtown, she witnesses Paula, one of Laura's teammates, enter jogging trails in the woods. Paula is subsequently stabbed to death by an unseen killer.

Anne attends a graduation rehearsal at the high school, where she is set to be a special guest. Afterward, she visits Laura's boyfriend, Kevin, and gives him one of Laura's medals as a memento. Meanwhile, Sally, a gymnast preparing for a photoshoot, is startled by her classmates Doris and Joanna in the locker room. Shaken, she is unable to perform her routine for the shoot. In the locker room, Sally is confronted by a person dressed in fencing attire who stabs her through the throat with a fencing sword.

The next day, Ralph, another track member, encounters Doris and Joanna on the trails in the woods. They jokingly take his football and throw it into the underbrush before leaving. While searching for the ball, Ralph is confronted by the killer, who throws the ball back to him with a metal spike attached, impaling and killing him. That night, a graduation dance takes place at the high school. Dolores, a flirtatious track team member, leaves the dance with her boyfriend Tony. The two venture into the wooded trails to have sex. The two are met by the killer, who decapitates them both with a sword.

Principal Guglione fields phone calls from the worried parents of Paula, Sally, Tony, and Dolores, all of whom have gone missing. An inspector, Halliday, arrives to investigate. Meanwhile, alone on the track field, track member Pete runs to attempt a pole vault. However, the pads in the pole vault pit have been replaced by steel spikes and he is killed upon impact. Halliday subsequently questions Coach Michaels about the youth's disappearances; Michaels, enraged, informs Halliday he has just been fired due to the negative publicity surrounding Laura's death.

Simultaneously, Doris and Joanne discover Sally's corpse stuffed in a locker in the locker room. Their screams alert Coach Michaels, who stumbles upon the scene, along with Kevin. Kevin accuses Coach Michaels of being the killer, and a fight ensues. Anne and Halliday also arrive at the scene; Anne notices a photo of the track team inside the locker, with each member's face—except for Kevin's—crossed out. Coach Michaels flees to the wooded trails, with Kevin pursuing him, and Anne and Inspector Halliday trailing behind. Coach Michaels discovers Ralph's body before he is met by a knife-wielding Kevin, who reveals himself to be the killer—it is he who has been systematically dispatching the track team, to which he has affixed blame for Laura's death. A struggle ensues during which Coach Michaels gains control of the knife. Halliday, arriving at the scene, shoots Coach Michaels to death, assuming him to be the perpetrator.

A short time later, Anne visits Kevin's house. Upstairs, she discovers Laura's corpse in Kevin's bedroom, donning a graduation cap and gown. A crazed Kevin enters the room and attempts to kill Anne out of fear she will "take Laura away" from him. During a struggle, Anne throws Kevin, along with Laura's corpse, through the window. She flees the house and ends up at the high school track field. Kevin pursues her, chasing her beneath the bleachers, where she finds Dolores's severed head and Pete's spike-riddled body in a storage shed. During their physical altercation, Anne manages to push Kevin onto Pete's spike-riddled body, killing him.

After giving her statement to the police, a traumatized Anne returns home that night and hallucinates an undead Kevin in her room, when in reality it is just her drunk stepfather Ronald. The next morning, Anne impassively says goodbye and leaves the town in a taxi while the Graduation Day banner hangs over the main street.

Cast

Production
Pre-production commenced in 1980, where filming began on December 8 in Los Angeles, California.

Release
The film premiered in Los Angeles on May 1, 1981, where it grossed $98,000 from its opening weekend in sixteen theaters. It earned $512,884 between May 8–10 in eighty-three theaters, and $319,538 in seventy-four theaters during May 15–17. Its release was expanded to fifteen additional cities in the United States, beginning on May 22 until August 14, and finished with $23.9 million during its theatrical course.

Critical response
Graduation Day received unfavorable responses from film critics. Writing for The Washington Post, Richard Harrington criticized the film as "badly acted" and "seemingly shot with varied-quality stock footage". Linda Gross of the Los Angeles Times referred to it as "an insinuating and lecherous movie with many hokey effects and poor-quality acting",<ref>Gross, Linda (May 11, 1981). "Violence Reigns In 'Graduation Day". Los Angeles Times. Part VI, p. 5.</ref> while Variety similarly noted the film as "poor quality". The Fort Lauderdale Newss Candice Russell summarized it as a "drippy, dippy horror film", noting: "Because Graduation Day doesn't deserve to be taken seriously, it's fun to laugh at its incongruities".

Online film guide AllMovie awarded the film one out of five stars, calling it "standard" and wrote: "Graduation Day needed more time in the school of horror before it could truly make the grade", though praised its "creative" casting. On the internet review aggregator website Rotten Tomatoes, the film holds a 57% approval rating based on 7 reviews, with an average of 5.2/10. Many prominent critics in the U.S., especially on the East Coast and in large Midwestern cities, refused to review the film at all because they were disgusted by the wave of gory slasher films and had started boycotting new releases, in the hopes that this would hurt the slasher genre at the box office (for example, Gene Siskel and Roger Ebert did not discuss the film on their weekly TV show, nor did they write print reviews for it).

Home media
The film was originally released on VHS by Columbia Pictures Home Entertainment in 1982, and again in 1983 by RCA/Columbia Pictures Home Video. Troma Entertainment released Graduation Day'' on DVD for the first time on October 1, 2002, which was later released on December 20, 2005 by Legacy Entertainment. Vinegar Syndrome released the film on DVD and Blu-ray in North America in September 2014, while 88 Films released it on Blu-ray in the United Kingdom on October 13.

References

External links
 
 
 

1981 films
1981 horror films
1980s high school films
1981 independent films
1980s mystery films
1980s serial killer films
1980s slasher films
1980s teen horror films
American films about revenge
American exploitation films
American independent films
American high school films
American mystery films
American serial killer films
American slasher films
American teen horror films
Columbia Pictures films
Films set in California
Films shot in Los Angeles
Troma Entertainment films
American splatter films
1980s English-language films
Films directed by Herb Freed
1980s American films